Complex traits, also known as quantitative traits, are traits that do not behave according to simple Mendelian inheritance laws. More specifically, their inheritance cannot be explained by the genetic segregation of a single gene. Such traits show a continuous range of variation and are influenced by both environmental and genetic factors. Compared to strictly Mendelian traits, complex traits are far more common, and because they can be hugely polygenic, they are studied using statistical techniques such as quantitative genetics and quantitative trait loci (QTL) mapping rather than classical genetics methods. Examples of complex traits include height, circadian rhythms, enzyme kinetics, and many diseases including diabetes and Parkinson's disease. One major goal of genetic research today is to better understand the molecular mechanisms through which genetic variants act to influence complex traits.

History 

When Mendel's work on inheritance was rediscovered in 1900, scientists debated whether Mendel's laws could account for the continuous variation observed for many traits. One group known as the biometricians argued that continuous traits such as height were largely heritable, but could not be explained by the inheritance of single Mendelian genetic factors. Work published by Ronald Fisher in 1919 mostly resolved debate by demonstrating that the variation in continuous traits could be accounted for if multiple such factors contributed additively to each trait. However, the number of genes involved in such traits remained undetermined; until recently, genetic loci were expected to have moderate effect sizes and each explain several percent of heritability. After the conclusion of the Human Genome Project in 2001, it seemed that the sequencing and mapping of many individuals would soon allow for a complete understanding of traits’ genetic architectures. However, variants discovered through genome-wide association studies (GWASs) accounted for only a small percentage of predicted heritability; for example, while height is estimated to be 80-90% heritable, early studies only identified variants accounting for 5% of this heritability. Later research showed that most missing heritability could be accounted for by common variants missed by GWASs because their effect sizes fell below significance thresholds; a smaller percentage is accounted for by rare variants with larger effect sizes, although in certain traits such as autism, rare variants play a more dominant role. While many genetic factors involved in complex traits have been identified, determining their specific contributions to phenotypes—specifically, the molecular mechanisms through which they act—remains a major challenge.

Methods

QTL mapping 
A quantitative trait locus (QTL) is a section of the genome associated with variation in a quantitative, or complex, trait. To identify QTLs, QTL mapping is performed on individuals with differing genotypes. First, mapping involves either full-genome sequencing or the genotyping of many marker loci throughout the genome; then, phenotypes of interest are measured. For example, the expression levels of different genes in the genome is one commonly-measured phenotype (the associated loci are called eQTLs). At each locus, individuals are grouped by their genotype, and statistical tests are performed to determine whether measured trait values for one group differ significantly from the overall mean for all groups. Identified loci may not be QTLs themselves, but are likely in linkage disequilibrium—and therefore strongly associate—with the loci actually influencing the trait.

GWAS 
A genome-wide association study (GWAS) is a method similar to QTL mapping used to identify variants associated with complex traits. Association mapping differs from QTL mapping primarily in that GWASs are only performed with random-mating populations; because all the alleles in the population are tested at the same time, multiple alleles at each locus can be compared.

Genetic architecture 
Recently, with rapid increases in available genetic data, researchers have begun to characterize the genetic architecture of complex traits better. One surprise has been the observation that most loci identified in GWASs are found in noncoding regions of the genome; therefore, instead of directly altering protein sequences, such variants likely affect gene regulation. To understand the precise effects of these variants, QTL mapping has been employed to examine data from each step of gene regulation; for example, mapping RNA-sequencing data can help determine the effects of variants on mRNA expression levels, which then presumably affect the numbers of proteins translated. A comprehensive analysis of QTLs involved in various regulatory steps—promotor activity, transcription rates, mRNA expression levels, translation levels, and protein expression levels—showed that high proportions of QTLs are shared, indicating that regulation behaves as a “sequential ordered cascade” with variants affecting all levels of regulation. Many of these variants act by affecting transcription factor binding and other processes that alter chromatin function—steps which occur before and during RNA transcription.

To determine the functional consequences of these variants, researchers have largely focused on identifying key genes, pathways, and processes that drive complex trait behavior; an inherent assumption has been that the most statistically significant variants have the greatest impact on traits because they act by affecting these key drivers.  For example, one study hypothesizes that there exist rate-limiting genes pivotal to the function of gene regulatory networks. Others studies have identified the functional impacts of key genes and mutations on disorders, including autism and schizophrenia.  However, a 2017 analysis by Boyle et al. argues that while genes which directly impact complex traits do exist, regulatory networks are so interconnected that any expressed gene affects the functions of these "core" genes; this idea is called the "omnigenic" hypothesis. While these "peripheral" genes each have small effects, their combined impact far exceeds the contributions of core genes themselves. To support the hypothesis that core genes play a smaller than expected role, the authors describe three main observations: the heritability for complex traits is spread broadly, often uniformly, across the genome; genetic effects do not appear to be mediated by cell-type specific function; and genes in the relevant functional categories only modestly contribute more to heritability than other genes. One alternative to the omnigenic hypothesis is the idea that peripheral genes act not by altering core genes but by altering cellular states, such as the speed of cell division or hormone response.

References 

Quantitative genetics